Boddumamidi is a village in Y. Ramavaram Mandal, East Godavari district in the state of Andhra Pradesh in India.

Demographics 
As per the 2011 Indian census, the village had a population of 180, out of which 89 were male and 91 were female. Population of children below 6 years of age were 14%. The literacy rate of the village is 39%.

References 

Villages in Y. Ramavaram mandal